Stanley Bay is a bay in the southern part of Hong Kong Island, located in the Southern District, Hong Kong.

Geography

Stanley Bay is located in the south of Hong Kong Island, west of Stanley, Hong Kong and east of Chung Hom Kok.

Features
 St. Stephen's Beach
 Stanley Promenade
 St. Stephen's College
 Stanley Ma Hang Park
 Murray House
 Stanley Bay Main Sewage Pumping Station

Transport

Stanley Bay can be reached via Stanley Gap Road via Stanley Beach Road. Bus stop is located next to Stanley Police Station.

See also
 List of places in Hong Kong

References 

Bays of Hong Kong
Southern District, Hong Kong